International cricket matches are played between the teams representing their nations, organised by the International Cricket Council (ICC). The main forms are  Test matches, One-Day matches and Twenty20 matches.

Most games are played as parts of "tours" when one nation travels to another for a number of weeks or months and plays a number of matches of various sorts against the host nation. The ICC also organises competitions that are for several countries at once, including the Cricket World Cup & ICC T20 World Cup.

History

There was no formal structure for international cricket until the early 20th century. It had long been traditional for countries, without any intervention from a body such as the ICC, to organise for themselves the various cricket matches. The ICC later committed the Test-playing nations to play each other in a programme of matches over a period of 10 years known as the ICC Future Tours Programme. This system was set up to encourage some of the better-established countries to play the lesser nations more frequently.

Tours

Outline

Most Test, One-Day and Twenty20 matches take place in the form of "tours". In a tour, one nation travels to another and plays warm-up matches, which may be first-class matches, against domestic teams such as county or state teams, a series of Test matches against the host nation, and either a series of One-Day (ODi) and T20 matches against the host nation or a tournament involving the host nation and another touring nation. Tours may include Test, ODI and T20I matches, or just one or two of these formats.

Test series can last from two to six matches, but some tours consist of only a single Test. Six-match series were common in the 1970s and early 1980s, with the last six-match series to date taking place in 1997–98 between the West Indies and England. Ashes Test series in England were six-match affairs between 1981 and 1997, but Australia reverted to five matches in its home series from 1982–83.   The most important series last four or five matches, while the less important ones last two to three matches. Sometimes, a perpetual trophy is awarded to the winning team. Perpetual trophies include:
The Ashes (England–Australia)
Frank Worrell Trophy (Australia–West Indies)
Trans-Tasman Trophy (Australia–New Zealand Test series)
Chappell–Hadlee Trophy (Australia–New Zealand ODI series)
Border-Gavaskar Trophy (Australia–India)
Wisden Trophy (England–West Indies)
Warne–Muralidaran Trophy (Australia–Sri Lanka)
Basil D'Oliveira Trophy (England–South Africa) 
Pataudi Trophy (England–India Test Matches played in England)
Sir Vivian Richards Trophy (South Africa–West Indies)
Sobers–Tissera Trophy (West Indies–Sri Lanka)
Anthony de Mello Trophy (England–India Test Matches played in India)
Freedom Trophy (India–South Africa)
Clive Lloyd Trophy (West Indies–Zimbabwe)
Benaud–Qadir Trophy (Australia–Pakistan) 

One-day series generally last from three to seven matches. T20 series last from one to five matches.

Tours may include a multi-team one-day tournament, often referred to as a "triangular" or "quadrangular" tournament. Teams play a round-robin format, often with teams playing each other twice. Points are awarded for wins, ties and no results, and some tournaments also award bonus points based on the margin of victory. There may be a final match played between the two teams with the most points from the round-robin stage.

ICC Future Tours Programme 

In 2001 the ICC decided to create a plan designed to make all ICC full member countries play each other for Test cricket over a period of ten years (known as the ICC Ten Year Plan). This was approved in February 2001 by the ICC member countries. Starting from 2002 and running until 2011, it ensured that each Test country played the other nine home and away over a period of ten years, in addition to any matches the individual cricket boards organised on their own. Thus, India and Pakistan played 12 ODIs and 6 Tests against each other in their respective countries (not including neutral ground ODI tournaments such as the Asia Cup) from 2004 to April 2005, and played a further series of 3 Tests and 5 ODIs in the winter of 2006. However, because of the rigorous schedule of the Ten Year Plan, there was hardly any time left over to schedule other series, and there were voices criticising the amount of international cricket that is played, with the risk of injury and player burnout as reasons for why this amount should be reduced. The ICC defended their policy, citing the number of international players in English county cricket as a sign that there was not too much cricket for the players.

Despite criticism of its original Ten Year Plan, the ICC created an ICC Future Tours Programme (or FTP for short). In the same way as for the Ten Year Plan, this is a schedule of international cricket tours which structure the programme of cricket for ICC full members, with an objective of each team playing each other at least once at home and once away over a period of 10 years. If the cricket boards of two individual countries reach an agreement, they can play more than two series. If a team doesn't want to travel to a particular country for a bilateral series due to security reasons, then, by the mutual agreement of the respective boards, that series can be shifted to a neutral venue or another country with appropriate facilities, such as in the United Arab Emirates. Recently, the Pakistan Cricket Team has played many of their home bilateral series on Emirati soil.

Matches at neutral venues

In addition to tours, nations may organise one-day matches at neutral venues. The Sahara Cup was a one-day series played annually between India and Pakistan in Toronto, until the Indian government ordered the suspension of all cricketing ties with Pakistan because of the countries' hostile diplomatic situation. The BCCI revived ties in 2004. Similarly, a semiannual Triangular Tournament was organised at Sharjah, in the United Arab Emirates. However, the tournament has lost its lustre because the overwhelming number of cricket matches has spoiled the pitch.

In contrast to the one-dayers, Tests are almost never held in neutral venues. A once-off triangular Test tournament was held in England in 1912, which saw South Africa play Australia in three tests at neutral venues, but otherwise it has only been security risks which have seen Tests played on neutral soil. Most notably, Pakistan has "hosted" Test series in England, the UAE and Sri Lanka in the 21st century. Security implications have also affected tours to Sri Lanka and tours to Zimbabwe in the past.
The final of ICC World Test Championship is played at neutral venues.

ICC competitions

Men's

The main international tournaments organised by the ICC include the ICC World Test Championship, the World Cup, the T20 World Cup, and the ICC Champions Trophy. The World Cup is held every four years; it involves all the Test-playing nations and a number of teams advancing from the immediately preceding ICC World Cup Qualifier. The T20 World Cup, which is generally held every two years and, as in the latest competition, involves the ten full ICC members and six associate members who qualified through a qualifier competition, the ICC World Twenty20 Qualifier. The ICC also organise ICC Champions Trophy, previously known as the ICC Knockout Cup, a shorter tournament that was held every four years in between World Cups.

A league competition for ODIs, the 2020–2023 ICC Cricket World Cup Super League, began in 2020.

Events won by each team:

Total no. of ICC main events played so far:
Cricket World Cup: 12; 
T20 World Cup: 8; 
Champions Trophy: 8;
World Test Championship: 1

Note: The 2002 ICC Champions Trophy was won by India & Sri Lanka (declared co-champions after the final was a no result due to heavy rain).

ICC International Rankings

Test Rankings 

In essence, after every Test series, the two teams involved receive points based on a mathematical formula. The total of each team's points total is divided by the total number of matches to give a 'rating', and the Test-playing teams are by order of rating (this can be shown in a table).

From 2002 to 2019, the top-ranked Test team was awarded with the ICC Test Championship mace and the top team at each April 1 cut-off (until 2019) was also awarded a cash prize, the winners of which are listed below. The mace is now awarded to the winners of the ICC World Test Championship.

ODI Rankings 

The ICC Men's ODI Team Rankings were created, and are run, by the ICC for reasons similar to the Test Rankings. The rankings are simply an international ranking scheme overlaid on the regular ODI (One Day International) match schedule. After every ODI match, the two teams involved receive points based on a mathematical formula. The total of each team's points total is divided by the total number of matches to give a rating, and all teams are ranked on a table in order of rating. The ranking does not replace the World Cup; the latter still carries much more significance to most cricket fans.

The ranking consisted two separate tables until merged into a single table in 2018. The ten ICC Full Members that play Test cricket were automatically listed on the main table while the six Associate Members with One Day International status were listed on a secondary table, but are eligible for promotion to the main table by meeting certain criteria.

T20I Rankings 

As with the Test and ODI Rankings, the ICC Men's T20I Team Rankings are an international Twenty20 ranking system run by the ICC. It is simply a ranking scheme overlaid on the regular T20I match schedule. After every T20I match, the two teams involved receive points based on a mathematical formula. The total of each team's points total is divided by the total number of matches to give a rating, and all teams are ranked on a table in order of rating. This ranking does not replace the ICC World Twenty20 competition.

Competitions for ICC Associate members

Competitions for member nations of the ICC with Associate status include:

ICC Cricket World Cup League 2

It features seven teams, 
Scotland, Nepal and the United Arab Emirates were joined by the top four teams(Namibia, Oman, Papua New Guinea, United States) from the 2019 ICC World Cricket League Division Two tournament.

The top three teams will advance to the 2022 Cricket World Cup Qualifier tournament, with the bottom four teams advancing to the 2022 ICC Cricket World Cup Qualifier Play-off.
All matches played as One Day Internationals (ODIs). Each set of fixtures will take part as a tri-series.

ICC Cricket World Cup Challenge League

The Cricket World Cup Challenge League replaced the World Cricket League (WCL) which was previously used as the pathway to the Cricket World Cup. The first fixtures took place in September 2019, with all matches having List A status.

The league features the twelve teams ranked from 21st to 32nd place in the WCL following the conclusion of the 2019 ICC World Cricket League Division Two tournament in Namibia. The twelve teams are split into two groups, with each group playing a six-team tournament three times on an annual basis. 

The top team in each group will advance to the Qualifier Play-off, taking place in 2022, which feeds into the 2022 Cricket World Cup Qualifier tournament. The remaining ten teams will be eliminated from the 2023 World Cup.

ICC Intercontinental Cup

This allowed teams the chance to play first-class cricket matches against teams of similar skill in a competition environment, and prepared them for eventual promotion to Test cricket status.

World Twenty20 Qualifier

Defunct competitions

World Cricket League

The ICC WCL (known as the Pepsi ICC World Cricket League for sponsorship reasons) is a series of international one-day cricket tournaments for national teams without Test status, administered by the ICC. All associate and affiliate members of the ICC are eligible to compete in the league system, which features a promotion and relegation structure between divisions. The league system has two main aims: to provide a qualification system for the World Cup that can be accessed by all associate and affiliate members, and as an opportunity for these sides to play international one-day matches against teams of similar standards.

The top division of the WCL is known as the ICC World Cricket League Championship.

Since the WCL started in 2007, the final matches in the WCL have formed the ICC World Cup Qualifier competition. This competition dates back to 1979.

Other Competitions 
The ICC in association with Commonwealth Games Federation and International Olympic Committee also conducts Twenty20 Cricket Tournament for Women in Commonwealth Games.

See also

 Test cricket
 One Day International
 Twenty20 International
 ICC Future Tours Programme
 List of International Cricket Council members
 ICC Awards
 Cricket gk in hindi

References

External links
Cricinfo – International Cricket Calendar
The "Silly Point" |||. International Fixtures
ICC Rankings
ICC Home Page

 
International Cricket Council